Alain Lenotre  is a certified pastry chef, candy maker,  and ice cream maker. He was trained as a cook at a famous 3-Star Michelin restaurant in Paris, the Grand Vefour. He was also the General Director of LENOTRE PARIS from 1972 to 1982. In addition to that, he received a Master Baker Certificate from Retail Bakers of America in July 1987.

In 1998, Alain and Marie Lenotre opened the Culinary Institute Lenotre. 

In October 2011, Alain Lenotre opened Le Bistro. Located within the Culinary Institute Lenotre, the Lounge is a restaurant open to the public while also serving as a training center for students.

References

External links
 Culinary Institute - Lenotre cooking school in Houston, USA
 Le Bistro at CIL

French chefs
Living people
Pastry chefs
Year of birth missing (living people)